Myopa is a genus of flies from the family Conopidae.

They are parasitic on honey bees Apis mellifera, also Andrena, and mustache bees Anthophora.

Species
M. bohartorum Camras, 1953
M. buccata (Linnaeus, 1758)
M. castanea (Bigot, 1887)
M. clausa Loew, 1866
M. curticornis Kröber, 1916
M. curtirostris Kröber, 1916
M. dorsalis Fabricius, 1794
M. extricata Collin, 1960
M. fasciata Meigen, 1804
M. fenestrata Coquillett, 1902
M. flavopilosa Kröber, 1916
M. longipilis Banks, 1916
M. melanderi Banks, 1916
M. metallica Camra, 1992
M. minor Strobl, 1906
M. mixta Frey, 1958
M. morio Meigen, 1804
M. occulta Wiedemann in Meigen, 1824
M. perplexa Camras, 1953
M. picta Panzer, 1798
M. plebeia Williston, 1885
M. polystigma Rondani, 1857
M. rubida (Bigot, 1887)
M. stigma Meigen, 1824
M. strandi Duda, 1940
M. tessellatipennis Motschulsky, 1859
M. testacea (Linnaeus, 1767)
M. variegata Meigen, 1804
M. vesiculosa Say, 1823
M. vicaria Walker, 1849
M. virginica Banks, 1916

References

Conopidae
Conopoidea genera
Taxa named by Johan Christian Fabricius